Jacob "Job" de Ruiter (30 April 1930 – 4 October 2015) was a Dutch politician and diplomat of the defunct Anti-Revolutionary Party (ARP) party and later the Christian Democratic Appeal (CDA) party and jurist.

De Ruiter worked as a researcher at the Utrecht University from 1953 until 1955 and as a lawyer and prosecutor in The Hague and Amsterdam from 1955 until 1963 and also served as a judge at the court of Utrecht from 1962 until 1963. De Ruiter worked as a professor of Criminal law and Family law at the Vrije Universiteit Amsterdam, taking office on 1 August 1963. He also served as Rector Magnificus of the Vrije Universiteit Amsterdam, taking office on 1 January 1976. After the election of 1977 De Ruiter was appointed as Minister of Justice in the Cabinet Van Agt–Wiegel, taking office on 19 December 1977. De Ruiter was elected as a Member of the House of Representatives after the election of 1981, taking office on 10 June 1981. Following the cabinet formation of 1981 De Ruiter continued as Minister of Justice in the Cabinet Van Agt II, taking office on 11 September 1981. The Cabinet Van Agt II fell just seven months into its term on 12 May 1982 and was replaced by the caretaker Cabinet Van Agt III with De Ruiter continuing as Minister of Justice, taking office on 29 May 1982. After the election of 1982 De Ruiter returned as a Member of the House of Representatives, taking office on 16 September 1982. Following the cabinet formation of 1982 De Ruiter was appointed as Minister of Defence in the Cabinet Lubbers I, taking office on 4 November 1982. In January 196 De Ruiter announced his retirement from national politics and that he would not stand for the election of 1986. The Cabinet Lubber III was replaced by the Cabinet Lubbers II on 14 July 1986.

De Ruiter retired from active politics and returned to the public sector and was appointed as Attorney General of the Courts of Appeal of Amsterdam, serving from 1 September 1986 until 1 January 1991. He also served as a distinguished professor of Criminal law and Family law at the Utrecht University, serving from 15 February 1989 until 1 May 1995.

Decorations

References

External links

Official
  Mr.Dr. J. (Job) de Ruiter Parlement & Politiek

 
 

 
 

 

 
 

1930 births
2015 deaths
Anti-Revolutionary Party politicians
Commanders of the Order of the Netherlands Lion
Christian Democratic Appeal politicians
Dutch academic administrators
20th-century Dutch judges
Dutch legal scholars
Dutch prosecutors
Family law scholars
Grand Officiers of the Légion d'honneur
Knights Commander of the Order of Merit of the Federal Republic of Germany
Members of the House of Representatives (Netherlands)
Members of the Royal Netherlands Academy of Arts and Sciences
Ministers of Defence of the Netherlands
Ministers of Justice of the Netherlands
People from Hardinxveld-Giessendam
People from Naarden
Protestant Church Christians from the Netherlands
Recipients of the Grand Cross of the Order of Leopold II
Rectors of universities in the Netherlands
Reformed Churches Christians from the Netherlands
Scholars of criminal law
Academic staff of Vrije Universiteit Amsterdam
Utrecht University alumni
Academic staff of Utrecht University
20th-century Dutch civil servants
20th-century Dutch educators
20th-century Dutch politicians